Seething is a small village in Norfolk, England, about 9 miles south east of Norwich.

Its church, St Margaret, is one of 124 existing round-tower churches in Norfolk.

Both Seething Airfield, formerly RAF Seething, and Seething Observatory are located to the south of the village, inside the village of Mundham.

Notes

External links

St Margaret's on the European Round Tower Churches website

Villages in Norfolk
Civil parishes in Norfolk